Johnny and his Cellar Rockers was the Dutch guitar player Jan Akkerman's first band from 1963. It also featured the drummer Pierre van der Linden who later joined Akkerman in Brainbox and Focus.

The band covered many songs, including "Sukiyaki" and "A Picture of You".

References

Dutch musical groups